was a Japanese film director. He is known for directing the film G.I. Samurai .

Selected filmography

Film 
 Shayō no Omokage aka The Lonely Life (1967) (Fist work as a director)
 Sannin no Onna Yoru no Chō aka Night Butterflies (1967)
 Onna no Iji (1971)
 Akumaga kitarite fue wo fuku (1979)
 G.I. Samurai (1979)
 Ninja Wars (1982)
 Tsumiki Kuzushi (1983)
 Kizudarake no Kunshō (1986)

Television 
 Taiyō ni Hoero! 
 Oretachino Tabi (1976)
 Lone Wolf and Cub (Second season)
 Choshichiro Edo Nikki (1983-1991)
 Unmeitōge (1993)
 Kumokiri Nizaemon (1995)
 Mito Kōmon series
 Sengoku Jieitai: Sekigahara no Tatakai (2006)
 Chushingura Sono Otoko Ōishi Kuranosuke (2010)

References

External links

Japanese film directors
1932 births
2012 deaths